A list of films produced in France in 1917.

See also
 1917 in France

References

External links
 French films of 1917 at the Internet Movie Database

1917
Lists of 1917 films by country or language
Films